The Russian Professional Basketball League Awards were the awards that were given out by the former top-tier level professional basketball league in Russia, the Russian Professional Basketball League (PBL).

PBL Awards

Russian Professional Basketball League (PBL) 2010–11 season awards

PBL Regular Season MVP
 Maciej Lampe (UNICS Kazan)

PBL Playoffs MVP
 Victor Khryapa (CSKA Moscow)

PBL All-Symbolic Team
PBL First Symbolic Team
 Patrick Beverley (Spartak St. Petersburg)
 Keith Langford (Khimki Moscow Region)
 Henry Domercant (Spartak St. Petersburg)
 Sergei Monia (Khimki Moscow Region)
 Maciej Lampe (UNICS Kazan)
PBL Second Symbolic Team
 Marcus Williams (Yenisey Krasnoyarsk)
 Terrell Lyday (UNICS Kazan)
 Ramūnas Šiškauskas (CSKA Moscow)
 Jeremiah Massey (Lokomotiv Kuban)
 Lonny Baxter (Yenisey Krasnoyarsk)

Russian Professional Basketball League (PBL) 2011–12 season awards

PBL Regular Season MVP
 Davon Jefferson (Triumph Lyubertsy)

PBL Playoffs MVP
 Alexey Shved (CSKA Moscow)

PBL All-Symbolic Team
PBL First Symbolic Team
 Patrick Beverley (Spartak St. Petersburg)
 Zoran Planinić (Khimki Moscow Region)
 Davon Jefferson (Triumph Lyubertsy)
 Andrei Kirilenko (CSKA Moscow)
 Jeremiah Massey (Lokomotiv Kuban)
PBL Second Symbolic Team
 Torey Thomas (Spartak Primorye)
 Vitaly Fridzon (Khimki Moscow Region)
 Sergey Karasev (Triumph Lyubertsy)
 Victor Khryapa (CSKA Moscow)
 Vladimir Veremeenko (UNICS Kazan)

See also
Russian Gold Basket Awards

References

External links
Russian Professional Basketball League official website 

awards
European basketball awards